Raymond J. Brancheau (October 26, 1909 – July 28, 1970) was an American football coach.  He served as the head football coach at Western New Mexico University from 1934 to 1948.  Brancheau played college football for the Notre Dame Fighting Irish and was named Most Valuable Player for the 1933 team.

References

External links
 

1909 births
1970 deaths
American football halfbacks
Notre Dame Fighting Irish football players
Western New Mexico Mustangs football coaches
People from Monroe, Michigan
Players of American football from Michigan